Hiatt is an extinct town in Webster County, in the U.S. state of Missouri.

A post office called Hiatt was established in 1899, and remained in operation until 1905. The community has the name of the local Hiatt family.

References

Ghost towns in Missouri
Former populated places in Webster County, Missouri